M.S.G. is the third and final studio album by Michael Schenker and Robin McAuley's project, the McAuley Schenker Group. It was released in 1991 in Japan and 1992 in Europe.

Bass guitarist Jeff Pilson and drummer James Kottak previously played together in Michael Lee Firkins's backing band and Wild Horses. Kottak, who had also previously played in the original line-up of Kingdom Come, later joined Schenker's former band Scorpions.

Track listing
All songs written by Michael Schenker and Robin McAuley except where noted.
"Eve" – 4:52
"Paradise" – 4:07
"When I'm Gone" (Jesse Harms, McAuley) – 4:47
"This Broken Heart" – 4:47
"We Believe in Love" – 5:12
"Crazy" (Rocky Newton, McAuley) – 4:53
"Invincible" – 3:42
"What Happens to Me" – 5:02
"Lonely Nights" – 4:29
"This Night Is Gonna Last Forever" (Newton, Kenny Stewart) – 4:51
"Never Ending Nightmare" – 6:24

Note that "Paradise" is not the same song as the one McAuley recorded with his old band, Grand Prix.

Personnel
Band members
Robin McAuley – vocals
Michael Schenker – guitars, backing vocals
Jesse Harms – keyboards
Jeff Pilson – bass guitar
James Kottak – drums

Additional musicians
Steve Mann – keyboards on "Never Ending Nightmare"
Rocky Newton – backing vocals

Production
Kevin Beamish – producer, engineer, backing vocals
Frank Filipetti – producer, engineer and mixing on "Never Ending Nightmare"
Randy Nicklaus – executive producer
Mick Gusauski – engineer, mixing
Bruce Barris – engineer
Steve Hall – mastering
Hugh Syme – art direction, design

References

1992 albums
EMI Records albums
McAuley Schenker Group albums
Albums produced by Kevin Beamish
Albums recorded at Sound City Studios